Events from the year 1977 in art.

Events
 April 19 – Yale Center for British Art gallery, designed by Louis Kahn (died 1974), opens to the public in New Haven, Connecticut, United States.
 May 8–24 – Suzanne Lacy's extended performance piece about rape, Three Weeks in May takes place in Los Angeles.
 September 12 – American poet Robert Lowell dies having suffered a heart attack in the back of a cab in New York City while returning to his ex-wife Elizabeth Hardwick carrying a portrait of his current wife Lady Caroline Blackwood by her first husband Lucian Freud.
 Starr Kempf constructs the first of his "wind sculptures".
 documenta 6 takes place.
 Douglas Crimp curates "Pictures," featuring Jack Goldstein, Cindy Sherman, Sherrie Levine and others, at Artists Space in New York.
 Tehran Museum of Contemporary Art in Iran, designed by Kamran Diba, is inaugurated.

Awards
 Archibald Prize: Kevin Connor – Robert Klippel

Exhibitions
 Retrospective of Valentine Hugo at the Centre Culturel Thibaud de Champagne, Troyes.
 Retrospective of Frida Kahlo at the Instituto Nacional de Bellas Artes, Mexico City.

Works

 Marina Abramović and Ulay – Expansion in Space
 Walter De Maria – The Lightning Field (land art)
 Lucian Freud – Naked Man with Rat
 Tina Girouard - "Pinwheel" (performance instillation at the New Orleans Museum of Art)
 Gilbert & George – Series of Red Morning works
 David Hockney – My Parents
 Donald Judd – Untitled (Meter Box)
 Nabil Kanso – The Vortices of Wrath (Lebanon 1977)
 Jacob Lawrence – Self-portrait
 Jacques Lipchitz – Bellerophon Taming Pegasus (sculpture, New York City)
 Kathleen McCullough – Cat in Repose (sculpture, Portland, Oregon)
 Gordon Matta-Clark – Jacob's Ladder
 Ivan Meštrović – Martin Kukučín (sculptures)
 Robert Morris – Williams Mirrors
 Maria Prymachenko - Two-Headed Chicken
 David Shepherd – Tiger in the Sun
 Cindy Sherman – Untitled Film Stills (through 1980)
 C. Talacca – Statue of Simón Bolívar (bronze, Houston, Texas)
 Jean Tinguely – Tinguely Fountain and Carnival Fountain (Fasnachtsbrunnen) (both kinetic sculptures in Basel)
 Don Wilson – Interlocking Forms (sculpture, Portland, Oregon)
Felix de Weldon – Statue of Ty Cobb (bronze, Royston, Georgia)
 Audrey Flack - World War II (Vanitas)

Births
 8 February – Yucef Merhi, Venezuelan artist, poet and computer programmer.
 16 April – Florentijn Hofman, Dutch installation artist.
 14 May – Emeka Ogboh, Nigerian sound and installation artist.
 5 October – Hugleikur Dagsson, Icelandic cartoonist
 16 December – Kevin Gillespie, American comic book creator and graphic artist.
 Michael Dean, English sculptor.
 Gregory Halpern, American photographer.

Deaths
 27 April – Charles Alston, American artist, muralist, and teacher (b. 1907).
 27 June – Ivan Tabaković, Serbian painter (b. 1898)
 3 July – Gertrude Abercrombie, American painter (b. 1909).
 21 July – Lee Miller, American photographer (b. 1907).
 23 August – Naum Gabo, Russian sculptor (b. 1890).
 3 September – Gianni Vella, Maltese painter and cartoonist (b. 1885)
 11 September – Augustus Dunbier, American painter (b. 1888).
 23 September – John Nash, English painter, illustrator, and engraver (b. 1893).
 25 September – William McMillan, Scottish sculptor (b. 1887) (victim of assault).
 20 October – Marie-Thérèse Walter, mistress of Pablo Picasso (b. 1909).
 4 November – Keith Vaughan, English painter (b. 1912) (suicide).
 5 November – René Goscinny, French comic book author, editor and humorist (b. 1926).
 21 December – Seán Keating, Irish romantic-realist painter (b. 1889).

Full date unknown
 Philip Lindsey Clark, English sculptor (b. 1889)
 Pan Yuliang, Chinese-born painter (b. 1899)
 Walter Pritchard, Scottish stained glass artist, muralist and sculptor (b. 1905)

See also
 1977 in fine arts of the Soviet Union

References

 
Years of the 20th century in art
1970s in art